Gary Richard Wheelock (born November 29, 1951) is a former Major League Baseball pitcher for the California Angels and Seattle Mariners (1977).

He is currently the pitching coach of the Peoria Mariners, and is in his 26th season in the Mariners' organization.

Wheelock attended the University of California, Irvine, where he played college baseball for the Anteaters from 1972-1974.

References

External links

1951 births
Living people
Baseball players from California
Major League Baseball pitchers
California Angels players
Seattle Mariners players
Quad Cities Angels players
Salt Lake City Gulls players
Salinas Packers players
San Jose Missions players
Spokane Indians players
San Antonio Dodgers players
UC Irvine Anteaters baseball players
Alaska Goldpanners of Fairbanks players